Hanspeter Mössenböck (born January 20, 1959 in Schwanenstadt, Austria) is an Austrian computer scientist. He is professor of practical computer science and systems software at the Johannes Kepler University Linz and leads the institute of systems software.

Life 
From 1978 to 1983 Mössenböck studied computer science at the JKU and did his doctorate 1987 "sub auspiciis Praesidentis" supervised by Peter Rechenberg. From 1987 to 1988 he was postdoc at the Universität Zürich and from 1988 to 1994 assistant professor at the ETH Zürich. He worked with Niklaus Wirth on the Oberon programming language and the Oberon system. He was founder and first president of the CHOOSE, the Swiss Group for Object-oriented Software Engineering with the Swiss Informatics Society (SI).

1994 Mössenböck became professor for Informatik (Systemsoftware) at the JKU. In the summer of 2000 he did his sabbatical at Sun Microsystems JavaSoft group in California. A long term research cooperation resulted, with Sun, now Oracle. Since 2002 he presides the study commission Informatik, since 2004 he is leading the department of system software, since 2008 he is member of the Technischen Universität Graz university council.

2006 he became honorary doctor of the Eötvös Loránd Universität Budapest. From 2006 to 2013 he also led the Christian Doppler laboratory for automated software engineering at the JKU.

Work and research interest 
Mössenböcks research interests include programming languages, compiler construction, and automate software development.

In compiler construction Mössenböcks research group works the following topics. First, dynamic compilation, with areas like static single assignment form, feedback directed optimisation, dynamic redefinition of programs. Second, they work on allocation of registers of processors and ways to optimize dynamic compilation, like escape analysis, object inlining. Research results of the research group, e.g. register allocation, static single assignment form, escape analysis landed in Sun Microsystems java compiler. Mössenböck is the author of the open source compiler generator Coco/R which is used in quite a number of universities and companies.

In the software engineering domain the research interest is on object oriented and component based systems, especially on composing software dynamically via plug-ins. Further areas of work are domain specific language and tools.

Honours 

 Ehrensenator at Technischen Universität Graz (2018)
 Ehrendoktorat der Eötvös Loránd Universität Budapest (2006)
 Unterrichtspreis des Departements Informatik der ETH Zürich (1989)
 Promotion „sub auspiciis praesidentis rei publicae“ (1987)
 Richard-Büche-Preis der Sparkasse Oberösterreich (1978)

References

External links 

 
 Informationen about Hanspeter Mössenböck
 Compiler Generator Coco/R
 Christian Doppler Labor für Automated Software Engineering
 Publikationen by Hanspeter Mössenböck
 The Programming Language Oberon-2 H. Mössenböck, N. Wirth, Institut für Computersysteme, ETH Zürich, January 1992
 Differences between Oberon and Oberon-2 Mössenböck and Wirth (1991)

1959 births
Austrian computer scientists
Academic staff of ETH Zurich
Academic staff of Johannes Kepler University Linz
Living people